Sinomonas tropicus is a Gram-positive bacterium from the genus of Sinomonas which has been isolated from the rhizosphere of a mangrove from Pramuka Island in Indonesia.

References

Micrococcales
Bacteria described in 2015